Sambhaji Bhide is a Hindutva activist from Maharashtra. Bhide, a native of Sangli district, was a full-time worker for the Hindu-nationalist organisation, the Rashtriya Swayamsevak Sangh, before leaving to form his own organisation, the Shiv Pratishthan Hindustan, in the late 1980s. The organisation claimed to spread the teachings of Shivaji and his son Sambhaji.

He has a number of followers in Sangli, Kolhapur, Pune, Belgaum, Mumbai and Satara. He was described in a 2018 media report as being close to Indian Prime Minister Narendra Modi. In 2008, his followers ransacked movie halls showing the film, Jodhaa Akbar; Bhide was arrested for his role in the unrest.

Bhima Koregaon violence
On 2 January 2018, a First Information Report was filed against him and Milind Ekbote for inciting the 1 January 2018 violence on Dalits in Bhima Koregaon. Bhide claimed that the roots of the violence lay in the Elgar Parishad of 31 December 2017. He demanded that leaders such as Prakash Ambedkar, who had spoken at the event be arrested. In August 2018, a petition was filed before the Bombay High Court seeking Bhide's arrest for his role in the Bhima Koregaon violence. Activists approached the Supreme Court of India to demand an independent probe as to why the Pune police had not arrested Bhide till date despite multi-city searches and the addition of UAPA provisions.  This petition was dismissed by the three judge bench with Justice Dhananjaya Y. Chandrachud dissenting.

References

External links 
 BBC report fact-checking Bhide's educational qualifications (in Marathi)

Living people
Place of birth missing (living people)
Savitribai Phule Pune University alumni
Rashtriya Swayamsevak Sangh members
Marathi people
1933 births